The Blue Collar Caucus is a United States Democratic Party congressional caucus that advocates for labor and working class priorities. It was founded in 2016 to focus the Democratic Party on blue-collar issues. The caucus supports increased infrastructure spending and opposes offshoring.

Electoral results

House of Representatives

Caucus members

Current members

Miscellaneous
In March 2018, former Vice President Joe Biden met with the Caucus to discuss 2018 midterm campaigning.

See also
Congressional Progressive Caucus
Labor Caucus (United States)
Reagan Democrat

References

External links
 

Democratic Party (United States) organizations
Political organizations established in 2016
Factions in the Democratic Party (United States)
Ideological caucuses of the United States Congress